General elections were held in Curaçao on 5 October 2016, having been postponed from 30 September due to Hurricane Matthew. A total of thirteen parties participated.

Electoral system
The 21 members of the Estates are elected by proportional representation. Parties that won seats in the previous elections are allowed to participate, whilst primary elections are held to determine which other parties can run, with parties required to receive the equivalent of 1% of the vote at the previous elections in order to participate.

Primary elections
Primary elections were held prior to the elections for new parties or parties that had failed to win seats in the previous elections in 2012, with parties having to obtain the equivalent of 1% of the vote in the previous elections; i.e. 870 votes.

The primary elections took place on 20 and 21 August 2016, with seven of the fifteen participating parties qualifying:

Results

References

Curacao
General
Elections in Curaçao
Curacao